Albion Rovers Football Club is an association football club based in the city of Newport, South Wales who play in the Gwent County League First Division, which is at the fifth tier of the Welsh football league system.

The team was formed by Scottish coalminers who moved to Newport for work in 1937. They named the team after Albion Rovers of their homeland in Coatbridge. They currently play at Crindau Park (also known as Kimberley Park) but have also shared Newport Stadium with Newport County.

Famous ex-players include Nathan Blake, Neil Swift, Tim Coleman, Sean Hamill, Bobby Campbell, Mike Harris, Kevin Hole, Michael Herbert. During the mid 1970s Peter Nicholas (Crystal Palace, Arsenal and Wales) and Tony Pulis (Premier League manager) also played for the Albion.

Between 1993 and 2005 the club played in the Welsh Football League, before at the end of the 2004–05 season being relegated to the Gwent County League.

On 24 July 2010, Albion Rovers played Premier League side Stoke City in a friendly to celebrate the opening of the clubhouse at Kimberley Park. Stoke won the match 9–0.

The club returned to the Welsh Football League in 2018 after 14 years by winning promotion. They finished bottom of the league at the end of the 2019–20 season and were relegated back to the Gwent County League, and in 2021–22 were relegated to Division One.

Honours

Gwent County League
Division One – Champions: 2017–18
Division One – Runners-up: 2008–09, 2009–10, 2010–11, 2014–15
Gwent County FA Senior Cup
Winners (3): 1947–48, 1980–81, 1988–89
Gwent County FA Amateur Cup
Winners (6): 1959–60, 1986–87, 1987–88, 1989–90, 1990–91, 2014–15
Gwent County League Motors Cup – Winners: 2016–17

References

External links
 Albion Rovers AFC website

Football clubs in Newport, Wales
Football clubs in Wales
Association football clubs established in 1937
1937 establishments in Wales
Gwent County League clubs
Welsh Football League clubs